A prestige picture is a film produced to bolster the film studio's perceived artistic integrity, rather than to turn a large profit; the studio may even expect the film to lose money.

History
Prestige pictures are largely the province of major Hollywood film studios — such as Metro-Goldwyn-Mayer and Warner Bros. — that produce numerous films every year. 

In the 1930s, such studios might release one prestige picture per year. The films' screenwriters drew material from historical events, well-known literary classics, or popular novels or plays.

Notable examples
In many cases, Hollywood film studios have enlisted British actors and directors for the production of prestige films. One producer of prestige pictures within the United Kingdom's own film industry was Alexander Korda (1893–1956).

See also

 Art film
 Cinema of the United Kingdom
 Cinema of the United States
 Film criticism
 Quality television
 New Hollywood
 Indiewood
 Oscar bait

References

Further reading
 

Film and video terminology